The idea of sexual script brings a new metaphor and imagery for understanding human sexual activity as social and learned interactions. The concept was introduced by sociologists John H. Gagnon and William Simon in their 1973 book Sexual Conduct. The idea highlights three levels of scripting: cultural/historical, social/interactive and personal/intrapsychic. It draws from a range of theories including symbolic interactionism, discourse theory and feminism. The theory of sexual scripting brings sociological, cultural, anthropological, historical and social psychological tools to the study of human sexualities. Whereas human sexuality is usually seen as the province of the biologist and the clinician, scripting helps research and analysis to understand sexualities as less biological and more cultural, historical and social.

Sexual script 
Sexual scripts are guidelines for appropriate sexual behavior and sexual encounters. Sexual behavior and encounters become behavior which is learned as well as instinctive. Each partner in consensual encounters acts as if they are an actor in a play or film following a script, rather than acting on impulse alone. Research on sexual scripts and sexual script theory have concluded that sexual scripts are gendered. Thus, sexual scripts have been described by researchers as a form of social construction. Sexual Script Theory (SST) and its application in clinical practice are founded on the idea that the subjective understandings of each person about his or her sexuality (and called a sexual script) substantively determine that person's choice of sexual actions and the subsequent qualitative experiencing of those sexual acts. Scripts refer to social functions. They dictate what one should be doing at a particular time and in a particular place if one is to play the role characteristically associated with that script. There may be several people involved in the same situation, but they may differ in the roles that they have been given or have chosen to enact.

Sexual scripting suggests the importance of meanings and symbols in human sexuality. According to Gagnon and Simon, scripts can be layered through three dimensions: 'cultural scenarios', 'interpersonal scenarios', and 'intrapsychic scenarios'. Sexual feeling does not simply happen from within the body, but needs meanings and symbols which provide cues and clues to enable sexualities to develop. Cultural scenarios are linked to different historical periods and social change; scripts can be shown to change with the arrival of HIV/AIDS in the 1980s, for example (Epstein, Lauman ...). Interpersonal scenarios are linked to encounters and interactions (for example in rape, as illustrated in the early work of Stevi Jackson). Also intra-psychic scenarios indicate the ways in which personal sexual 'turn ons' and imageries grow. Sexual scripts can be seen as providing guidelines for appropriate sexual behaviour and sexual encounters, as sexual behaviour and encounters are learned through culture and others in interactions. It can be linked to theories of sexual desire but is critical of the tendency to stress the purely biological aspects of desire.

Developments
Drawing upon conversational analysis, sexual encounters are considered to be scripted if the parties involved use any of these five linguistic devices:
 References to predictable stages
 References to common knowledge
 The production of consensus through seamless turn-talking and collaborative talk
 The use of hypothetical and general instances
 Active voicing
Research on sexual scripts and sexual script theory have concluded that sexual scripts are organised through gender, class, ethnicity and other social vectors.

Sexual script theory and its application in clinical practice are founded on the undeniable reality that the subjective understandings of each person about his or her sexuality (and called a sexual script) substantively determine that person's choice of sexual actions and the subsequent qualitative experiencing of those sexual acts. Scripts refer to social functions. They dictate what one should be doing at a particular time and in a particular place if one is to play the role characteristically associated with that script. There may be several people involved in the same situation, but they may differ in the roles that they have been given or have chosen to enact. Script theory is a form of social scripting theory which has been defined clearly by Michael W. Wiederman: "Social scripting theory points to the fact that much of sexual behavior seems to follow a script. Similar to scripts that stage actors use to guide their behavior, social scripts instruct members of a society as to appropriate behavior and the meanings to attach to certain behaviors."

Social scripting theory directly relates to sexual scripts, as it is just a specified example regarding sexual encounters and sexual behavior in social context. Social theory is also a useful resource in determining the construction of social scripts.

Social constructionism 
The theory is linked to the wider development of social constructionism on the socially-created nature of social life. Social construction is important to sexual scripts because they can come from how a child is raised through the beliefs of social construction. In other words, women are to be subjected to male gaze to be a part of the social construction system and maintain social norms of a long-living society.

Sexual norms 
A sexual norm can be an individual or a social norm, which is a rule that is socially enforced. Norms affect a wide variety of human behavior.
Social norms regarding sexuality are present in most cultures. For example, the norm in most cultures consists of heterosexual acts between married individuals. Sexual norms are constantly changing and normal sexual behavior is a spectrum and cannot be rigidly defined. 
Deviance from normal sexual behavior is common and can be classified in several ways. If non-restrictive sexual norms are regarded positively they may be called "sexual freedom", "sexual liberation", or "free love". If regarded negatively they may be called "sexual license" or "licentiousness". Restrictive behavior when judged negatively is called "sexual oppression"; if judged positively they are called "chastity", "sexual restraint", The Marital Effect, or "sexual decency".
In the West, sexual normality can be defined as any sexual practice which does not involve sexual perversions. There has been a liberalization in attitudes which has resulted in the legalization of homosexuality in many countries. There is a tendency in Western countries toward serial monogamy as a normal heterosexual lifestyle.

Gender script 

Gender schema theory also plays a part in sexual script because studies show that males and females interact in different ways, even from a young age. In 1991, Martha Boston and Gary Levy found that through their research observations, children, primarily boys, were better with being able to sequence own-sex rather than other-sex scripts. "As well as acquiring knowledge about the sex-role stereotypes of their culture, young children also develop sex-typed attitudes, preferences, and behaviors that pervade many aspects of their lives."

From an early age, men are often raised to embrace their sexuality, but women are usually brought up to suppress it. Anatomically, boys have the benefit (or curse) of genitals that are more easily viewed and handled by their owners. The young boy is taught to hold onto his penis to urinate and to handle it for purposes of washing. Conversely, the young girl is not taught to touch her clitoris. She is taught to wipe carefully after urination to avoid contracting an infection by transferring bacteria from her rectum to her vagina. The result is that boys and girls are given two subtly different sets of messages regarding their own genitals. Boys readily discover that their genitals feel good when handled and are not necessarily any “dirtier” than other parts of their body that they can see. Girls readily learn that their genitals are difficult, if not impossible, for them to see and that there are “dirty” aspects, which require appropriate precautionary measures. Similarly, gender roles may encourage sexual exploration more for boys than for girls.

A double standard exists in the traditional heterosexual sexual script. It endorses different sexual behavior for women and men in which women are expected to confine sexual behavior to the context of a committed relationship, and men are expected to engage in sexual behavior in all kinds of relationships. Young adult men who have not realized that their female peers hold a different set of sexual scripts are often perplexed. When young adults have finally gained a marked increase in privacy from family (such as going away to college or getting married), it often seems obvious to young men that sexual activity should “naturally” occur since a major barrier has been overcome. Females who take such a view run the risk of being labeled deviant. To be too sexually interested or aggressive, especially outside the context of an intimate relationship, implies masculinity, or desperation, or some other flaw.

Ellen van Oost uses the concept of gender script "to illustrate the ways that the design of technological artifacts are affected by the gender assumptions held about their 'envisioned users.'" Drawing from Akrich's argument that "like a film script, technical objects define a framework of action together with the actors and the space in which they are supposed to act," van Oost extends the script approach to include the gender aspects of technological innovation. van Oost looks at the ways electric shavers are gendered for men and women starting in the late 1920s, including the "cigar" model for men and the "lipstick model for women." Van Oost also argues that the development of the electric razor systematically constructs a gender script of technological incompetence as feminine, and "inhibits the ability of women to see themselves as interested in technology and as technologically competent, whereas the genderscript of [electric razors "for men"] invites men to see themselves that way. In other words: [electric razors] not only [produce] razors but also gender."

Applications 
The theory has now been applied to a wide range of areas such as the following:
 Young gay men (Matt G Mutchler)
 Rape (Stevi Jackson)
 Pornography (Jeffrey Escoffier)
 'My types' (David Whittier)
 Men's scripts (Christopher T. Norwood)
 Women's scripts (Judith Long Laws & Pepper Schwarz; Breanne Fahs & Rebecca F. Plante)
 HIV and AIDS (Lauman, Seidman)
 Sexual pharmacology (Leonore Tiefer)
 Love (Lyndsey Moon)
 Bodies (Stevi Jackson and Sue Scott)
 Technologies and their design (Ellen van Oost)

References

Further reading
 Gagnon, J., and W. Simon, Sexual Conduct: The Social Sources of Human Sexuality. Aldine, 1973.
 Michael Kimmel ed The Sexual Self: The Social Construction of Sexual Scripts, Vanderbilt, 2007
 Plummer, K. (2010). "The social reality of sexual rights." In P. Aggleton & R. Parker (Eds.), Routledge Handbook of Sexuality, Health and Rights (pp. 45–55). New York, NY: Routledge.

Sexual acts
Human sexuality
Social constructionism